Loïc Pierre Thierry Leclercq (born 23 October 1988) is a French former professional footballer who played as a defender.

Career
After being released from French Ligue 1 club Lille OSC, Leclercq trialled in England before signing for Étoile FC, an all-French team in the Singaporean S.League, helping them win the league and cup. However, he left at the end of the season because his girlfriend was unable to join him.

For the 2012–13 season, Leclercq signed for A.F.C. Tubize in the professional Belgian Second Division, but soon left for amateur French sixth division side US Marquette due to not getting along with the head coach.

References

External links
 

Living people
1988 births
People from Armentières
Sportspeople from Nord (French department)
French footballers
Footballers from Hauts-de-France
Association football defenders
Étoile FC players
R.F.C. Tournai players
A.F.C. Tubize players
French expatriate footballers
French expatriate sportspeople in Belgium
Expatriate footballers in Belgium
French expatriate sportspeople in Singapore
Expatriate footballers in Singapore